USA-17 (formerly known as BMW Oracle Racing 90 or BOR90) is a sloop rigged racing trimaran built by the American sailing team BMW Oracle Racing to challenge for the 2010 America's Cup. Designed by VPLP Yacht Design with consultation from Franck Cammas and his Groupama multi-hull sailing team, BOR90 is very light for her size being constructed almost entirely out of carbon fiber and epoxy resin, and exhibits very high performance being able to sail at 2.0 to 2.5 times the true wind speed. From the actual performance of the boat during the 2010 America's Cup races, it can be seen that she could achieve a velocity made good upwind of over twice the wind speed and downwind of over 2.5 times the wind speed. She can apparently sail at 20 degrees off the apparent wind. The boat sails so fast downwind that the apparent wind she generates is only 5-6 degrees different from that when she is racing upwind; that is, the boat is always sailing upwind with respect to the apparent wind. An explanation of this phenomenon can be found in the article on sailing faster than the wind.

Design
USA 17 was designed by VPLP.

Career

Launching and initial testing

BOR 90 was launched in Anacortes, Washington in August 2008 after more than 9 months of construction. She underwent initial testing in Anacortes before being shipped to San Diego, California for additional sea trials and development.

In March 2009, USA 17 (then referred to as BOR90) was pulled from the water for extensive modification in BMW Oracle Racing's San Diego shop. She emerged in early July, 2009, featuring wave-piercing hulls and other modifications. She was further modified subsequently, in particular in October 2009 to add an engine to power hydraulic winches.

On November 8, 2009, the team announced that a rigid sail wing had been built for the yacht. The wing has a very high aspect ratio, meaning that it is very tall and narrow. It can change camber to adjust lift in order to optimize performance. The wing consists of two main elements, separated by a vertical slot through which air can flow. The rear element is made up of several separate sections, whose angle can be adjusted separately, much like the flaps on an airplane's wing. Thus the lift of the sail can be controlled very finely, both overall, and for each section.

The wing is more efficient than a traditional soft-sail rig setup. On November 10, BMW reported that they hit  boat speed in a  reported wind speed. During the first race of the 2010 America's Cup, USA 17 was able to sail upwind faster than Alinghi 5 even without a jib. Since the sail area of USA 17s wing is much larger than the sail area of Alinghi 5s mainsail and jib combined, it is clear that the rigid wing is much more efficient than even high-performance traditional sails.

America's Cup

Race 1
The first race of the 2010 America's Cup took place on February 12, 2010. USA 17 beat the defender, Alinghi 5. USA 17 started behind by 1:27 after start box maneuvering with Alinghi, but was ahead by 3:21 at the windward mark and by about 9 minutes at the finish. Her official finish time was 15:28 ahead of the loser because Alinghi 5 had to perform a penalty turn, having failed to stay clear at the start.

Wind speeds were  during the first race.

The measured sea-level wind direction shifted away from 180 degrees between the time of setting of the course and commencement of sailing of the downwind leg, by which time wind direction was reported to be at around 160 degrees. As such the ratio between downwind velocity made good and wind speed is an approximation only.

Race 2
On February 14, 2010, USA 17 also won the second race, and thus the America's Cup, again by a considerable margin. USA 17 was ahead by 0:24 at the start, by 0:28 at the windward mark, by 2:44 at the gybe mark, and by over 4 minutes at the finish. Her official finish time was 5:26 ahead of the defender because Alinghi 5 had to perform a penalty turn, having entered the pre-start area too soon.

Wind speeds were  during the second race. The course was a triangle, so the velocity made good downwind was only , or about 1.4 times wind speed. USA 17 averaged , or about 3.6 times the wind speed, on the faster first triangular leg.

Observers stated that the rigid wing had given USA a decisive advantage.

See also
List of large sailing yachts

Notes

References

External links

BOR 90 Trials Bayshots Images
BMW Oracle Racing official site
VPLP Yacht Design
Hundreds of images of the BOR 90
ABC News Story on BOR and the BOR90 (video)
CBS News Story on BOR and the BOR90 (video)
35th America's Cup official site 
 Podcast of technical interview with the designer

Trimarans
America's Cup challengers
2000s sailing yachts
Sailing yachts built in the United States
Sailing yachts designed by VPLP
Sailing yachts of the United States
2010 America's Cup
Oracle Team USA